Sinfonietta may refer to:

 Sinfonietta (orchestra), a musical group that is larger than a chamber ensemble but smaller than a full-size orchestra
 Sinfonietta (symphony), a symphony that is smaller in scale or lighter in approach than a standard symphony
Sinfonietta (Britten), a 1932 composition by Benjamin Britten
 Sinfonietta (Janáček), a 1926 composition by Leoš Janáček
 Sinfonietta (Korngold), a 1912 composition by Erich Wolfgang Korngold
 Sinfonietta (Moroi), a 1943 composition by Saburō Moroi
 Sinfonietta (Theodorakis), a 1947 composition by Mikis Theodorakis
 Sinfonietta (Poulenc), a 1947 composition by Francis Poulenc
 Sinfonietta, a 1978 ballet by Jiří Kylián